Yuryansky District is an administrative and municipal district (raion), one of the thirty-nine in Kirov Oblast, Russia. It is located in the north of the oblast. Its administrative center is the urban locality (an urban-type settlement) of Yurya. Population:  22,893 (2002 Census);  The population of Yurya accounts for 28.2% of the district's total population.

People
 Nikolai Vasenin (1919-2014)

References

Notes

Sources

Districts of Kirov Oblast